Renuka Shahane (born 7 October 1966) is an Indian actress working in the Bollywood film industry and in Indian television, best known as the co-presenter of the Doordarshan TV show Surabhi (1993–2001).

Early life
Renuka Shahane was born into a Marathi family in Bombay (present Mumbai). Her father, Lt. Cdr. Vijay Kumar Shahane, was an officer in the Indian Navy. Her mother, Shanta Gokhale, is a theatre personality and film critic who works mainly on Marathi theatre. When Renuka was very young, her mother divorced her father and married Arun Khopkar, a film-maker. The second marriage also ended in divorce, after which Shanta Gokhale began a long-term friendship with Jerry Pinto, also a film journalist like her. 

Renuka and her only sibling, Girish Shahane grew up with their mother in Mumbai. Renuka did her B.A. in Psychology from St. Xavier's College and her Post graduation in Clinical Psychology from Mumbai University.

Her brother Girish Shahane is a contemporary writer, art critic, and artist who has been associated with several art fairs and is a columnist with Scroll.in.

Personal life 
Renuka has been married twice. Her first marriage was to Vijay Kenkare, a Marathi theater writer and director, but the marriage did not last long and they were soon divorced. She then married Ashutosh Rana (original name Ashutosh Neekhra), who is also a Bollywood actor. They have two sons, namely Shauryaman Neekhra and Satyendra Neekhra.

Career

Renuka Shahane started her career with the Marathi film Hach Sunbaicha Bhau. She then worked as one of the two anchors of the vastly popular Hindi language TV show, Surabhi, and this is what made her a household name. Her broad smile became a byword for charm in the era when Doordarshan was the only TV channel in India, and Renuka was certainly one of the most popular TV personalities of the 1980s.

In 1994, at the height of her fame while hosting Surabhi, Renuka got the opportunity to act in the movie Hum Aapke Hain Koun..!, that soon became the highest grossing Indian movie. Her role in the film was much appreciated and added to her image of a storehouse of wholesome, traditional values.

Renuka Shahane has acted in many Marathi Films. She released her first Marathi film as a director, called Rita. Adapted from her mother Shanta Gokhale's novel, Rita Welingkar, Renuka plays the pivotal role of a friend, guide and philosopher of Rita, the protagonist. Rita had Jackie Shroff, Pallavi Joshi, Suhasini Mulay and Mohan Agashe in the cast. She also acted in a Telugu movie Money, produced by Ram Gopal Varma, which was a big hit.

Circus was one of the initial Indian television serials that she starred in. She portrayed the love interest of then relatively unknown Shah Rukh Khan's character. Her role as a strong-willed woman in another television serial, Imtihaan was widely appreciated. Tribhanga is Renuka Shahane's first Hindi directorial starring Kajol, Tanvi Azmi, Mithila Palkar, Kunaal Roy Kapur, Vaibhav Tatwawaadi, Manav Gohil, Kanwaljeet Singh, Shweta Mehendale, Nishank Verma.

Filmography

Films

Television

Web series

References

External links

1966 births
Living people
Indian television actresses
Indian film actresses
Actresses in Marathi cinema
Actresses in Hindi cinema
Actresses in Marathi television
Actresses in Hindi television
20th-century Indian actresses
21st-century Indian actresses
Actresses from Maharashtra
Marathi actors